Jaroslav Slávik (born 28 January 1976 in Poprad) is a Slovak luger who competed from 1990 to 2006. He won the bronze medal in the men's singles event at the 2004 FIL European Luge Championships in Oberhof, Germany.

Slávik's best finish at the Winter Olympics was 16th in the men's singles event at Salt Lake City in 2002 while his best World championship finish was tenth in the men's singles event at Park City in 2005.

References

External links 
 
 
 

1976 births
Living people
Lugers at the 2002 Winter Olympics
Lugers at the 2006 Winter Olympics
Slovak male lugers
Olympic lugers of Slovakia
Sportspeople from Poprad